Shazam, often referred to as simply The Wizard, is a character appearing in American comic books published by both Fawcett Comics and DC Comics. He is not to be confused with his champion Shazam/Captain Marvel, the former bestowing powers on the latter as detailed in the 1940s Whiz Comics. In more modern stories, however, after DC officially changed Captain Marvel's name to "Shazam" in 2012, the characters now sharing the name as part of a legacy hero archetype. 

Originally, Shazam was a powerful wizard of ancient Egyptian/Canaanite origin whose birth name was Jebediah. As a child, he was beswtoweds the powers of Gods of Canaanite origin and was referred to as simply the Champion, growing up to becoming an ancient hero and keeper of the Rock of Eternity. In his old age, he sought out a successor, first choosing Egyptian-born Black Adam, a decision he came to regret when the ancient former hero betrays him. Eventually, Shazam chose his successor in Billy Batson and began guiding the young boy who became the cornerstone of the Marvel Family. 

A new version of the Wizard appears in the New 52 onward, originally depicted as a Kahndaqi native sorcerer. This origin is later revised, instead depicting him as the fictional deity Mamaragan, a interpretation of the god of the same name from Australian Aboriginal mythology (specificall of the Kunwinjku). In this version, he adopted the names "The Wizard" and "Shazam" respectively. Acting as leader of the Council of Eternity, a group that governs magical matters, acts as keepers of the Rock of Eternity, and protects the world from evil, the council is eventually killed by Black Adam, who Mamaragan chose as his champion and eventual successor to his position. Being the sole survivor, Mamaragan continued his work as a keeper but eventually sought a new successors. Eventually, he chooses Billy Batson, who forms the spiritual successors of the Council of Eternity, the Shazam Family. 

The Wizard Shazam has appeared in numerous DC comics series and various media including television and the DC Extended Universe. Most notably, Djimon Hounsou played the modern iterations of the ancient wizard Shazam in the live-action films Shazam! (2019), Black Adam (2022), and Shazam! Fury of the Gods (2023).

Publication history
Created in the 1940s by Bill Parker and C. C. Beck for Fawcett Comics, he is an ancient wizard (Whiz Comics #2 gives his age as 3,000 years) who gives young Billy Batson the power to transform into Captain Marvel. Despite the new comic's popularity and theatrical success, Captain Marvel was similar enough to Superman that a court ruled against Fawcett in 1952.

Two decades after gaining the rights to Captain Marvel, DC Comics began publishing new stories under the title Shazam!. This became a problem for DC's lawyers, as the company had abandoned any rights to the Captain Marvel name, and it was now owned by rival Marvel Comics.

In 2012, DC officially changed Captain Marvel's name to "Shazam", to resolve trademark conflicts with the Marvel Comics character of the same name. Both the wizard and his champion shared the name of "Shazam" in the comic book stories published from then to date, the Wizard later revealing "Shazam" is an adopted name, his original name being Mamaragan.

Fictional character biography

Earth-S

Origin 
Originally, the wizard's name was Shazamo, the last letter standing for the hero of magic Oggar. However, Oggar became corrupt and tried to take power from Shazamo. The wizard defeated Oggar and cursed him to live in the world of mortals. He was given cloven hooves as a sign of his inner evil, and could cast each magic spell only once. Shazamo then dropped the last letter of his name.

Empowering Captain Marvel 
Shazam informs Billy that he is an ancient Egyptian wizard who has been using his powers for many centuries to fight the forces of evil, but that he is now old and not long for this world. He therefore passes along part of his power to Billy, who shouts his name– "SHAZAM!"– to transform into Captain Marvel/Shazam. He also then explains to Billy that his name: is an acronym for six ancient heroes. Each letter empowers him with certain attributes:

S The wisdom of Solomon;
H The strength of Hercules;
A The stamina of Atlas;
Z The power of Zeus;
A The courage of Achilles;
M The speed of Mercury.
Although Shazam is killed, as prophesied, by a giant granite block falling on him, Billy/Captain Marvel/Shazam can summon the ghost of Shazam for guidance by lighting a special brazier in Shazam's lair (the Rock of Eternity). More superheroes soon joined the superhero Shazam in carrying on the legacy of the wizard Shazam, including Shazam Family members Mary Marvel and Captain Marvel Jr. Shazam tells that once, 5,000 years before, he gave powers to Black Adam, but Black Adam was killed while turning back to his regular self. He died due to his advanced age.  

In the Marvel Family series, he was shown in some early issues carving the Marvel Family adventures into the Rock of Eternity.

Post Crisis

Post-Crisis origin and early history. 
In a story written by E. Nelson Bridwell for World's Finest Comics #262 (cover date April/May 1980), his gave him a backstory in which he was a young shepherd who becomes the Champion, one of the world's first superheroes in ancient Canaan, over 5,000 years ago. By speaking the magic word "VLAREM!" (an anagram of "Marvel"). This background is later explored further in the Power of Shazam! series, in which detailed during his tenure as a Champion,  At one point, the Champion is seduced by a demoness disguised as a beautiful woman, and the two of them conceive two half-demon offspring, Blaze and Satanus, much to the displeasure of the gods. The Champion later creates the Rock of Eternity from two large rock formations – one from Heaven and one from Hell – to hold the Three Faces of Evil, a dragon-like demon whose mother is the same demoness as the one who bore his children, captive. Shazam also later trapped demons of the Seven Deadly Sins in statues of themselves and imprisoned them at the Rock of Eternity.

Many centuries later, the Champion, now going by the name of "Shazam", feels the need to pass along his powers to a successor. He selects the pharaoh's son Teth-Adam to receive the power to become the superpowered Mighty Adam by speaking the word "SHAZAM!" However, Blaze interferes with this succession and Adam is given powers from the Egyptian deities instead. As her mother did, Shazam's daughter Blaze takes on the form of a beautiful woman and seduces Adam, convincing him to kill the pharaoh and take over the kingdom. An angry Shazam draws Mighty-Adam's powers out of him and into a large jeweled scarab, thereby killing Adam as he ages to death. Shazam then seals his remains and the amulet in a tomb. A wicked reincarnation of Teth-Adam named Theo Adam would steal the scarab many centuries later and use the power of Shazam to become Black Adam. Shazam was upset by this and did not consider passing on his powers for millennia.
The wizard resurfaces as an aide on the 1940 Malcolm Expedition, one of many archaeological expeditions into the tombs and pyramids of ancient Egypt. The sarcophagi of Ibis the Invincible and his mate Princess Taia are uncovered and brought to the United States. Shazam follows the sarcophagi. Once they are on display at the Fawcett City Museum, Shazam uses ancient spells to resurrect Ibis. Ibis then joins Bulletman, Spy Smasher, Minute-Man, and others to fight evil during the World War II era. In 1955, a thug knocks a weakened Shazam across the head with a crowbar and causes him to lose his memory. A clueless Shazam wanders around Fawcett for the next forty years until C.C. Batson, a young man Shazam had met on the Malcolm Expedition, recognizes the old man and brings him to the museum to restore his memory. Shazam feels that he has truly found his successor in the upstanding Batson, but before he can act on this, a possessed Theo Adam murders Batson and his wife Marilyn for the magic amulet. He therefore decides to enlist C.C. Batson's young son, Billy, as the successor to his power.

Day of Vengeance 
In Superman (vol. 2) #216, Shazam calls upon the Spectre to free Superman from being controlled by the demon Eclipso. This action breaks a covenant between Eclipso and the Spectre and sets Eclipso permanently at odds with the wizard. Possessing the body of Jean Loring, the Atom's ex-wife, Eclipso corrupts the confused Spectre into joining forces with her, and begins a war against all magic-powered beings in the DC Universe.

Because of his previous action, Shazam is one of the duo's primary targets. In the Day of Vengeance mini-series, Shazam enlists Captain Marvel to keep the Spectre at bay while the wizard gathers all of his power to battle him. With the assistance of the newly formed Shadowpact, a band of magic-based heroes, Captain Marvel fights the Spectre nearly to a standstill, but the Spectre escapes and makes his way to the Rock of Eternity to confront Shazam directly. While Shazam is preparing for his bout with the Spectre, he is confronted by Mordru who has just escaped the Rock of Eternity. Mordru and the wizard fight for a short time while the Spectre begins to approach, despite being delayed by fighting Captain Marvel. More concerned with escaping and staying out of the Spectre's way, Mordru leaves a slightly wounded and tired Shazam to fight the Spectre, who is already more powerful than him at full power. The Spectre overpowers the wizard, absorbs his magics, and kills him. As a result, the Rock of Eternity disintegrates above Gotham City into "a billion pieces" and explodes, freeing the Seven Deadly Sins along with many other demons and sending a depowered Billy Batson falling into the city.

In Infinite Crisis #1, Billy finds he is still able to transform into the Captain before he strikes the ground by saying the wizard's name as usual. It is also revealed that the entire affair was orchestrated by Alexander Luthor Jr. and the Psycho-Pirate to reduce magic to its raw form, the death of Shazam turning his name into a tether for the rest of the raw magic that Alexander could harness to power his tower by acquiring one of Shazam's champions, eventually forcibly 'enlisting' Black Adam for that purpose after failing to capture any of the other Marvels.

In Day of Vengeance: Infinite Crisis Special, the Shadowpact teams up with the majority of the DC Universe's surviving magical characters to rebuild the Rock of Eternity and reseal the Seven Deadly Sins. The final piece of the reconstruction, revealed by Zatanna, is that a new wizard has to be appointed to guard the Rock. Billy, as the only real candidate, is chosen to succeed Shazam as the Rock's new caretaker.

In the comic series 52, Captain Marvel is revealed to be currently headquartered at the Rock of Eternity, acting in Shazam's stead. He has already imprisoned the Sins again, although he claims they cause trouble at the full moon.

The Trials of Shazam! 

A year after the events of Infinite Crisis, The Trials of Shazam! mini-series features Captain Marvel, now with a white costume and long white hair, taking over the role of the wizard Shazam under the name Marvel while a powerless Freddy Freeman attempts to prove himself worthy to take on the powers of Shazam. Mary lost her powers a year after Shazam's death and fell from a great height, placing her in a coma. She later wakes up and accepts power from Black Adam.

Also attempting the Trials is Sabina who, with the assistance of The Council of Merlin, manages to gain several of the Powers of Shazam before Freeman can. During the Trials, Sabina kills Atlas with the dagger of three points, forcing Freddy and Marvel to briefly take on Atlas's burden until Freddy can convince Apollo to take on Atlas's burden instead in the hope that his healing power will be a sufficient substitute for Atlas's stamina, but Apollo shares his powers with Freddy and Sabina out of bitterness that he lost the family of his mortal identity when taking Atlas's place. At the series finale, Sabina and the Council of Merlin seek audience with Merlin himself, and convince him to aid them in an assault on New York City that would send the magical world out of balance. Merlin opens a portal through which several demons appear and begin converting humans to their ranks, the intention being that if one million souls are taken, Zeus will be forced to give his power to Sabina as Merlin will have a foothold on Earth. The Justice League arrive to join the fight and Freddy battles Sabina herself, but is seemingly beaten. However, during the fight, Freddy Freeman proves that he is willing to sacrifice himself by attempting to force both Sabina and himself back through the portal that the demons emerged from; an act that would end the assault, destroy the powers of Shazam, and kill both of them. Witnessing Freddy's willingness to die so that magical balance can be restored, Zeus, who had been disguised throughout the series as Freddy's friend Zareb Babak, a retired necromancer, reveals himself and informs Freddy that he is the most worthy, granting him the full power of Shazam. Freddy says the word aloud and the lightning comes down, transforming him into Shazam. Sabina is forced through the portal and killed, and the demons disappear or turn back into humans.

In this new incarnation, Shazam looks essentially like the original Captain Marvel, only with Freeman's long hair.

Return 
Some time after Shazam's appointment, Black Adam and his resurrected bride Isis, along with the corrupted Mary Marvel, wrest control of the Rock of Eternity from Marvel, turning him back into Billy Batson at the same time. The spirit of Billy and Mary's father recruits Jay Garrick to go on a mission to the netherworld domain called Rock of Finality where Shazam's spirit sealed in stone resides ever since he was slain by Spectre. Jay brings Shazam to Earth where Black Adam is convinced to give back his powers to restore Shazam so that the greatly corrupted Isis can be saved as she is planning to wipe out humanity. The restored wizard removes the powers from Isis and the Marvels and turns Teth-Adam and Adrianna to stone. Shazam tells Billy and Mary that they failed him and that their access to his power is cut off. He also returns Stargirl to Earth as his final favor to them. Shazam also mentions Freddy, stating that his magic comes from elsewhere, and that he too will be dealt with as Shazam closes up the Rock of Eternity to go deal with Freddy.

New 52 

While not part of the first wave of DC's The New 52 2011 line wide relaunch, it was announced at New York Comic Con on October 15, 2011, that Billy Batson would be featured in a backup story, "The Curse of Shazam!" beginning in Justice League (vol. 2) #7 in March 2012. It was confirmed by Geoff Johns, DC Comics' chief creative officer and the author of the story, that Billy Batson's alter ego would be called "Shazam" rather than "Captain Marvel" from now on. In DC's, 2012 Free Comic Book Day offering called The New 52 FCBD Special #1, it was revealed that seven wizards representing seven different mythologies occupied the Rock of Eternity at the dawn of time in The New 52. They harnessed the power of magic to cast out a "Trinity of Sin", which acted as a precursor to the 2013 Trinity War crossover event. A younger version of the Wizard is part of this group of wizards.

Origin & earlier history 
Originally, the Wizard is instead depicted as a powerful wizard named "Shazam" native of the Middle Eastern kingdom of Kahndaq. He would escape the kingdom before it's brutual history commensed and later became a member of the Council of Eternity, presiding over the Council as the leader.  Later, his history was retconned with a different origin, revealing himself to be the Aboriginal (Kunwinjku) deity, Mamaragan, whose songlines led him to a seat on the Council of Eternity, where he adopted the title "Wizard" and later Shazam.

As a member of the Council, one first actions was to punish and sentence the Earth's greatest transgressors. So they summoned Phantom Stranger, Pandora, and Question to the Rock of Eternity and evoked the different punishments on them. At some point in the Council of Wizards' history, most of the council members were killed by Black Adam except for the Wizard.

Shazam! (2013) 
Many years later, the Wizard appeared before Pandora. He is very weak and tells her that he has just given his power to a new champion of magic who will take his seat on the now destroyed council. The Wizard says that he has come to tell Pandora that he and the council were wrong for punishing her. He says that the other two members of the Trinity deserved their punishment but she was just a curious girl and he asks for her forgiveness. He then tells her that she can no longer open the box and that what had been released could not be put back. But there was still power within the box and it would take the strongest of heart or the darkest to open it. Then the vision disappears before Pandora can find out who that person might be. 

When Doctor Sivana opens Black Adam's tomb and frees Black Adam, the Wizard begins abducting people one by one via magic and bringing them to the Rock of Eternity to assess them for the job of inheriting his powers only to dismiss each of them for not being pure of heart. The Wizard then summons Billy to the Rock of Eternity as his last candidate, but upon meeting him sees how rotten a child he is and dismisses him as well until Billy argues that perfectly good people "really don't exist" and that the Wizard may never find what he is looking for. Agreeing with Billy and aware that he is dying, the Wizard sees that Billy has the potential to be good and passes on his powers to the boy by asking him to speak the magic word "Shazam" with "good intentions" as merely saying the word has no effect. After saying the magic word, Billy is struck by a bolt of lightning which transforms him into Shazam, a super-powered being possessing super-strength and flight. The Wizard then passes away and transports Shazam back to Earth.

Justice League: Darkseid War - Power of the Gods 
After Darkseid's death, Billy Batson found his powers disrupted, forcing the formerly deceased Wizard to return to life and hastily brokering deals with other new entities. This later puts him in conflict with Zonzsu, who is revealed to be Darkseid's father Yuga Khan, as he sought a god whose acroynmn started with the letter "Z" per the "SHAZAM" acronym. The Old God attempts to steal the Wizard's power but is stopped by Billy Batson using the new powers he gained from the newly associated gods that patron his power and his knowledge of how the Magic of Shazam works. The Wizard then reveals that the final god who empowers him is none other than himself, Mamaragan, who explains his origin and state the two will now be closer to one another than ever, even If he comes to regret it. The two then set off to a new adventure, with Billy empowered by a new set of gods.

DC Rebirth 
In the DC Rebirth relaunch, Mamaragan appears as a key member of The Immortals, a group founded by Hawkman and Hawkgirl to study the Dark Multiverse. In the present, they are headquartered in Antarctica. They advised Lady Blackhawk/Kendra Saunders to use the brain of Anti-Monitor to destroy the Dark Multiverse. His knife is taken by Batman and then Talia al Ghul in preparation against Barbatos.

Shazam! and the Seven Magiclands (2019-2020) 
Mamaragan later appears in the Gamelands part of the Magiclands where he picks up Pedro and Eugene. He teleports them to the Wozenderlands where he saves the White Rabbit from the winged monkeys that work for the Wicked Witches of the North, South, East, and West. Then he asks the White Rabbit where Alice is. As the White Rabbit comes along with them to meet up with Alice and Dorothy Gale, Mamaragan explains that all will be explained shortly. But right now, the trees are listening. While roasting apples and cucumbers at their campfire with the White Rabbit learning about Pedro and Eugene's experiences in the Funlands and the Gamelands, Mamaragan explains that the disruption in the transformation is on Billy's part as the seventh's champion needs to be found.

Mamaragan later teleports Billy, Mary, and C.C. away from Black Adam and the Seven Deadly Sins and brings them to the Wozenderlands. He then teleports the rest of Billy's foster family after Billy and Mary fought off the Cheshire Cat. After explaining that he needed Billy to believe that he passed away after their first meeting, Mamaragan explains that the error in the power-sharing spell is because of the conflict of his foster family and the return of C.C. where it can be remedied by sharing it with those that he deems family. Billy was able to remedy this by declaring that he'll share his powers with anyone he considers family. After the Shazam Family defeated King Kid, Billy brings Mamaragan the dinner that Tawky Tawny made. When asked about King Kid, Mamaragan states that King Kid has been returned to the Funlands where the adults will decide how to deal with him. He sends Billy on his way so that he can uncover the latest disturbance in the Magiclands. After seeing what he has to do later that night, Mamaragan strikes down C.C. as he states that he can't have him interfering. 

Billy investigates what happened and asks Mamaragan why he struck down his father. Mamaragan claims that C.C. is corrupting the magic which will interfere in stopping the upcoming threat while claiming that he chose poorly with Billy like he did with Black Adam. The rest of the Marvel Family join in the fight and suspect that he is not the real Mamaragan. As C.C. regains consciousness, he informs Victor, Rosa, and Tawky about a vision he had about the Magic War where Mamaragan slaughtered creatures throughout the lands and sealed them off from one another. Billy and C.C. use their powers to send Mamaragan back to the Rock of Eternity just as Black Adam arrives. Shazam figures out that Mamaragan attacked C.C. because he is the actual host of Mister Mind and not Doctor Sivana as they have freed the Monster Society of Evil. When Mamaragan witnesses the spell that Doctor Sivana cast to bring the Book of Champions out of the Rock of Eternity, Mamaragan comments that he made a big mistake. Mamaragan watches the fight between Shazam and Mister Mind from the Rock of Eternity. Following the defeat of Mister Mind and Superboy-Prime, Mamaragan has left the Rock of Eternity. From an unknown location, Mamaragan states that he is proud of Billy and that he would eventually lead Black Adam to a full redemption.

Powers and abilities
Overtime, the depiction of Shazam and his abilities differ from one another, although he commonly possessing powers both mystical and non-sorcerous in nature;

Fawcett Comics 
The original Shazam from Fawcett Comics was depicted as a godly being who possesed godly powers. He was powerful enough to have formerly led the gods that made up the name "Shazam" (formerly Shazamo). In the 20th century, however, he powers grew weaker; he once claimed to get his powers from his magic mantle which protected him from evil harm and enabled other powers. When it was removed, he lost his powers and became just an old man, although it does not appear to work for others; when Sivana put it on, he was not protected from Captain Marvel as it only protects the wearer from evil harm. In other stories, he is shown as being weaker, being captured even while wearing the mantle, and it is once shown that the brazier being lit will summon him even if he is not at the Rock of Eternity.

Golden Age 
In DC Comics' depiction of the Wizard, the original Golden Age incarnation was a powerful wizard who was adept at magic at a godly level, possessing a vast array of magical powers.  However, in a diminshed state,  he is only capable of conjuring mystical bolts and appear to advise members of the Marvel Family.   

The Golden Age version also once possessed powers when he acted as a Champion for the Caananite gods who empowered him with aspects of their power similarly to his suucessors. These powers were unrealted to the magical skills and abilities he learned later in his life. During his time as the Champion, he derived his abilities from Caananite gods by saying "Vlarem", granting him the following abilities:

Modern 
The Mamaragan incarnation of Shazam is similarly a powerful, immortal wizard and storm god with vast magical abilities whose abilities often manifests as lightning and/or invoked by saying "Shazam"; he is the creator of the Living Lightning spell, granting people powers associated with various aspects of divine entities that spell out "SHAZAM". He is also capable of siphoning  aspects of a divine entities' abilities for empowerment to his Champions, be it willingly or through force. 

At his peak, he was the most powerful member of the Council of Eternity, being the sole survivor of Black Adam's attack on the Council and manage to seal him away. He was also capable of fighting his Champion, Shazam, and the evil New God, Yuga Khan.

Other versions

Kingdom Come
In the Kingdom Come reality, Shazam is a member of the Quintessence and has been displeased that Billy Batson has been corrupted by Lex Luthor's influence.

Flashpoint
In Flashpoint reality, the power of the six Elders is divided up between six children who say Shazam together to transform into Captain Thunder, similar to the Lieutenant Marvels. They claim to have gotten on the subway car to Shazam's lair.

In other media

Television
 Shazam appears in The Kid Super Power Hour with Shazam!, voiced by Alan Oppenheimer.
 Shazam appears in the Batman: The Brave and the Bold episode "The Power of Shazam!", voiced by Jim Piddock. Doctor Sivana brings Black Adam out of his exile in a plot to steal Shazam's powers. Batman and Billy Batson visit his shrine to get answers about Black Marvel. Shazam reveals his history with him and Black Marvel and how he banished him to the furthest star. Just then, Black Adam and the Sivana Family arrived as Black Adam comes for revenge where Doctor Sivana reveals to Black Adam that Shazam resides in the Rock of Eternity. When confronting Shazam at the Rock of Eternity, Black Adam ended up fighting Shazam as Doctor Sivana sits on Shazam's throne double-crossing Black Adam. After Doctor Sivana is defeated, Black Adam disappears with Shazam fearing his return.
 Shazam (referred to as "The Wizard") appears in the Justice League Action episode "Classic Rock", voiced by Carl Reiner. This version is shown to still be alive. He is banished from the Rock of Eternity and stripped of his powers by Black Adam, but eventually returns with Batman's help, defeating Adam and sending him to the edge of the galaxy.
 Shazam appears in the Teen Titans Go! episode "Little Elvis", voiced by John DiMaggio. The Titans help him defeat Mr. Mind before he can unleash the Seven Deadly Enemies of Man onto mankind, with a few running gags such as the Titans finding it funny that Billy Batson can turn into Shazam simply by saying “Shazam!”, and underestimating Mr. Mind because of his small size.

Film

Animated
 Shazam appears in the short film Superman/Shazam!: The Return of Black Adam (released on the DC Showcase Original Shorts Collection DVD compilation as part of the DC Universe Animated Original Movies), voiced by James Garner. Upon Billy Batson making his way into Shazam's lair, Shazam relays to him that he is the next Chosen One. He explains that Black Adam had been the champion he had chosen 5000 years ago, but Teth-Adam had used his power for personal gain and corrupted the gift. He was then banished to the farthest star in the sky, and now Black Adam has returned seeking vengeance. Shazam then causes a cave in, telling him that he wishes to atone for the mistake of creating Black Adam. He tells Billy that should he need him, he has only to speak the Wizard's name.
 Shazam appears in Lego DC Super Hero Girls: Super-Villain High, voiced by Khary Payton.
 Shazam is featured in Lego DC Batman: Family Matters, voiced by Ralph Garman. His disembodied voice is heard where he gives information to Billy Batson on how to disarm a bomb. In the mid-credits, he is heard again telling Billy to board the train for the journey of a lifetime, which he agrees to do.
 Shazam also appears in Lego DC: Shazam!: Magic and Monsters.

Live-action
 Shazam appears in the 1941 film serial "Adventures of Captain Marvel", portrayed by Nigel De Brulier.
 Shazam appears in films set in the DC Extended Universe (DCEU), portrayed by Djimon Hounsou.
 He's appeared in the 2019 film Shazam!. Originally, Ron Cephas Jones was to play the character and had step down due to schedule conflicts. The film adaptation is said to take inspiration from The New 52 and pre-Flashpoint comic book versions and there was a reference to a previous champion who went rogue. He is first seen when he summons a younger Doctor Sivana to the Rock of Eternity in his quest to find a successor as he is getting too old. Shazam rejects him when the Seven Deadly Enemies of Man tempt him to touch the Eye of Sin. Years later, Doctor Sivana researched the people's different experiences with Shazam and used his notes to open a portal to the Rock of Eternity. Upon freeing the Seven Deadly Enemies of Man, Doctor Sivana is possessed by them as he defeats Shazam. Billy is later summoned to the Rock of Eternity and meets Shazam. Upon Billy holding onto Shazam's staff and quoting "Shazam", Billy is transformed into an adult superhero while Shazam crumbles to dust.
 Shazam made a cameo appearance in Black Adam, with Hounsou reprising his role. He and the Council of Wizards were responsible for empowering Hurut to be Kahndaq's champion until he was killed by King Ak-Ton's assassins while reviving his father Teth-Adam with his power. Shazam was the sole survivor of the Council of Wizards after Teth-Adam attacked them in rage when they deemed him unworthy of his power following his massacre of King Ak-Ton and his followers. He imprisoned Teth-Adam within what would become the tomb for both Adam and the Crown of Sabbac.
 Shazam also returns in Shazam! Fury of the Gods.In the film, the Wizard Shazam appears alive and imprisoned in the God Realm of the Daughters of Atlas, Hespera and Kalypso, who recover their destroyed staff in the Acropolis Museum and regain their powers again, forcing him to reforge the broken staff. The Wizard would then enters Billy's dream to warn him about the Daughters of Atlas. Later, the Wizard meets Freddy Freeman, who is also a prisoner, and the two escape with the help of Atlas's third daughter, Anthea, and reunites with Billy and the Shazam Family. After escaping and Billy's brothers (except him) losing his powers to Kalypso, the Wizard tells him that he chose Billy because of his selflessness and concern for his family and that he must accept himself as a true hero. Later, before a monster attack in the city, the Wizard helps the children to ride unicorns to scare them away. After Kalypso and her monsters were defeated by the Shazam Family and Billy, who also sacrificed his life, he was brought into the God's Realm to attend his funeral with the depowered staff. After Wonder Woman appears and restores the staff's power with her residual power of Zeus, this act revived both Billy and the powers once lost in the God's Realm, including Anthea. The Wizard gives the staff, and Billy uses the staff to restore the powers of the Wizard, Anthea, and his family. In the end, the Wizard and Anthea now live in the world with Billy's family, whom he visits. Reclaiming the staff, he leaves but not before christening his Billy's name to be "Shazam"

Video games
 Shazam appears in the Mortal Kombat vs. DC Universe video game voiced by Joe J. Thomas. After Captain Marvel fended off Raiden, the presence of Shazam appears and tells him that Dark Kahn is behind the world merge crisis and that Darkseid's essence has merged with evil magic from the other world. Shazam then tells Captain Marvel to help defeat Dark Kahn by gathering an "army of both dark and light" to fight him before the world merge is complete enough for the Kombat Rage to consume every living being on both worlds. In Superman's ending, Superman seeks the aid of Shazam to help him prepare for any protection against any future magical threats where they used ancient Kryptonian Lore to the creation of a new costume giving Superman an immunity to magic. In Captain Marvel's ending, Captain Marvel was guided by Shazam through a focusing ritual to regain control of his powers.
 Shazam is featured in Injustice: Gods Among Us. He appears as a support card in the mobile version of the game.
 Shazam appears as a playable character in Lego DC Super Villains. He is one of the bosses in the level “Fight at the Museum”, where after Joker, Harley Quinn, Clayface and Sinestro use an ancient artifact at Gotham Museum to revive Black Adam from his sarcophagus, Shazam and Mazahs appear to stop them and fight Black Adam and Sinestro, but are defeated. There is also a downloadable content version of the character who is supposed from the 2019 Shazam! and has the exact same powers as the regular Shazam, but has a different design as Billy Batson. The Wizard appears as a playable character as well and is needed for the "I am the Last Council of Wizards" Trophy, which is obtained by hurting Doctor Sivana in the second level as The Wizard.

References

External links
 Shazam at DC Comics Wiki
 Marvel Family Web entry on the wizard Shazam
 Earth-S Marvel Family Index

Comics characters introduced in 1939
Characters created by C. C. Beck
Characters created by Bill Parker (comics)
DC Comics characters with superhuman strength
DC Comics characters who can move at superhuman speeds
DC Comics characters who can teleport 
DC Comics characters who use magic
DC Comics fantasy characters
DC Comics film characters
DC Comics male characters
DC Comics telepaths
Egyptian superheroes
Fictional Canaanite people
Fictional ancient Egyptians
Fictional characters with electric or magnetic abilities
Fictional characters with eidetic memory
Fictional characters with precognition
Fictional characters with dimensional travel abilities
Fictional characters who can manipulate time
Fictional wizards
Marvel Family
Achilles
Atlas (mythology)
Heracles in fiction
Mercury (mythology)
Solomon
Zeus

de:Captain Marvel#Shazam